Empire of Cricket is a 2009 television series produced by the BBC. The series features four episodes profiling the histories of four leading Test cricketing nations: England, the West Indies, Australia, and India. Each episode is approximately one hour and features some of the most well-known incidents in cricket, including references to the Bodyline series, the Chappell underarm bowling incident of 1981, and the West Indies cricket team's first win at Lord's cricket ground.

References

External links
 

BBC television documentaries about history
2009 British television series debuts
2009 British television series endings
Cricket on television
2000s British sports television series
2000s British documentary television series